The Fimcap World Camp is an international social activity organized by the International Federation of Catholic Parochial Youth Movements (Fimcap). The World Camp is organized every three years hosted by a member organization of Fimcap from another country. The World Camp combines social work with intercultural exchange.

History
List of former Fimcap World Camps

References

External links
 Article about the Fimcap World Camp 2015 in Rwanda in the Belgian newspaper Nieuwsblad from the 10th of August 2015

Christian summer camps
Fimcap
Catholic organizations established in the 21st century